The Wagad Formation is a Mesozoic geologic formation in India. Fossil sauropod tracks have been reported from the formation.

See also

 List of dinosaur-bearing rock formations
 List of stratigraphic units with sauropodomorph tracks
 Sauropod tracks

Footnotes

Bibliography 
  

Geologic formations of India
Upper Cretaceous Series of Asia
Cretaceous India
Maastrichtian Stage
Ichnofossiliferous formations